Eunotiales is an order of diatoms, which belongs to Subclass Eunotiophycidae .

References

External links

 Eunotiales at WoRMS

 
Diatom orders